Jedlno Pierwsze  is a village in the administrative district of Gmina Ładzice, within Radomsko County, Łódź Voivodeship, in central Poland.

The village has a population of 410.

References

Jedlno Pierwsze